Lissominae is a subfamily of click beetles in the family Elateridae. There are about 11 genera in Lissominae.

Genera
These 11 genera belong to the subfamily Lissominae:
 Anaspasis Candèze, 1882
 Austrelater Calder & Lawrence, 1993
 Drapetes Dejean, 1821
 Hypochaetes Bonvouloir, 1859
 Lissomus Dalman, 1824
 Osslimus Calder, 1996
 Paradrapetes Fleutiaux, 1895
 Protelater Sharp, 1877
 Sphaenelater Schwarz, 1902
 Tunon Arias-Bohart, 2013
 Valdivelater Lawrence & Arias, 2009

References

Further reading

 

Elateridae